The following is a list of the people elected to the People's Assembly of Egypt in the 2011-2012 election.

Parliamentary Positions

 Speaker of the People’s Assembly: Mohamed Saad Tawfik Al Katatni, Freedom and Justice
 First Deputy Speaker: Ashraf Thabit Saad Eddin Al-Sayed, al-Nour
 Second Deputy Speaker: Mohamed Abdel Aleem Dawoud, Al-Wafd
 Chairman of the Foreign Affairs Committee: Essam al-Din Mohamed al-Erian, Freedom and Justice
 Chairman of the Legislative Parliamentary Committee: Mahmoud Reda Abdel Aziz al-Khudairi, Independent (aligned with Freedom and Justice)
 Chairman of the National Security Committee: Abbas Mohamed Mohamed Mukhaimar, Freedom and Justice
 Chairman of the Health Committee: Akram Al-Mendoh Awad Al-Shaer, Freedom and Justice
 Chairman of the Education and Scientific Research Committee: Shaaban Ahmed Abdel-Alim, al-Nour
 Chairman of the Human Rights Committee: Mohamed Anwar Esmat Sadat, Reform and Development
 Chairman of the Economic Affairs Committee: Tarek Hassan al-Desouki, al-Nour
 Chairman of the Labor Committee: Saber Abu al-Fotouh Badawi al-Sayed, Freedom and Justice
 Chairman of the Youth Committee: Osama Yassin Abdel Wahab Mohamed, Freedom and Justice
 Chairman of the Arab Affairs Committee: Mohamed Saeed Ibrahim Idris, al-Karama
 Chairman of the Culture and Media Committee: Mohamed Abdel-Moneim Mahmoud Al-Sawy, al-Hadara

Members of Egypt’s People’s Assembly

Proportional Representation List Seats (332 seats)

Cairo (36 seats)

First District (al-Sahel)
 01. Hazem Mohamed Farouk Abdel Khaleq (Professionals/Freedom and Justice)
 02. Rafat Hamed Tawfiq al-Adawi (Workers/ Freedom and Justice)
 03. Amin Suleiman Iskandar Suleiman (Professionals/al-Karama)
 04. Mohamed Abdul Rashid al-Sayyid Salameh (Workers/ Freedom and Justice)
 05. Emad Gad (Professionals/ Egyptian Social Democrat)
 06. Khalid Mohamed Abdel Aziz Shabaan (Workers/ al-Tagammu)
 07. Bassam Mohamed Kamel Hamid Nasr (Professionals/ Egyptian Social Democrat)
 08.Mamdouh Ahmed Ismail Ahmed (Professionals/ al-Asala)
 09. Mahmoud Abdullah Abdul Rasul (Workers/ al-Nour)
 10. Tariq Mohamed Sabiq al-Hussein (Workers/ al-Wafd)

Second District (Nasr City)
 11. Ahmed al-Imam Ali Abdel-Hamid (Workers/ Freedom and Justice)
 12. Abdel Basset Abdel Hay Mustafa Ismail (Workers/ Freedom and Justice)
 13. Mohamed Magdy Ali Hamid Qarqal (Professionals / Labor)
 14. Basil Mohamed Adel Ibrahim (Professionals/ Free Egyptians)
 15. Atef Mohamed Bayoumi Makhalif (Farmers / Free Egyptians)
 16. Adel Abd al-Maksoud al-Afifi (Professionals/ al-Asala)
 17. Majid Mohammad Sayid Musa (Workers/ al-Wasat)
 18. Margaret Aazar (Workers/ al-Wafd)

Third District (Qasr al-Nil)
 19. Wahid Mohamed Abdel al-Majid (Professionals/ Freedom and Justice)
 20. Adel Abdel-Ati Abdel-Hamid (Workers/ Freedom and Justice)
 21. Jamal Jinfi Jamal Ali (Professionals / Freedom and Justice)
 22. Ahmed Hassan Helmi Saeed (Professionals/ Free Egyptians)
 23. Ayman Taha Khalil Mohamed (Workers/ Free Egyptians)
 24. Ashraf Mustafa Hussein Ali (Professionals/ al-Nour)
 25. Ahmed Darwish (Workers/ al-Nour)
 26. Mohamed Hussein Mohamed al-Maliki (Workers/ al-Wafd)

Fourth District (Maadi)
 27. Osama Yassin Abdel Wahab Mohamed (Professionals/ Freedom and Justice)
 38. Al-Mohamedi Abdul Maqsoud Mohamed (Workers/ Freedom and Justice)
 29. Hatem Abu Bakr Ahmed Azzam (Professionals/ al-Hadara)
 30. Adel HamidMustafa (Workers/ Freedom and Justice)
 31. Mohamed Ahmed Atta Ammara (Professionals/ al-Nour)
 32. Mahmoud Gharib Abdel Hafez (Workers/ al-Nour)
 33. Ziad Abdel-Hamid al-Alimi (Professionals/ Egyptian Social Democrat)
 34. Mahmoud Ezz Al-Arab Mohamed Al-Sakka (Professionals/ al-Wafd)
 35. Abdul Hakim Ismael Eid (Workers/ Revolution Continues)
 36. Jamal Mustafa Abdul Muttalib Kassab (Workers/ al-Wasat)

Alexandria (16 seats)

First District (Montaza)
 37. Subhi Saleh Mousa Abu Assi (Professionals / Freedom and Justice)
 38. Saleh Noman Mubarak Bilal (Workers/ Freedom and Justice)
 39. Ashraf Thabit Saad Eddin Al-Sayed (Professionals/ al-Nour)
 40. Mohammad Ramadan Ali Younes (Farmers / al-Nour)
 41. Hosni Hafiz Ibrahim Mohamed (Workers/ al-Wafd)
 42. Ibrahim Abdel Wahab Muhyi al-Din Abu Ahmed (Professionals/ Free Egyptians)

Second District (Moharram Bey)
 43. Hussein Mohamed Ibrahim Hussein (Professionals / Freedom and Justice)
 44. Ahmed Gad al-Rab Mahmoud Ahmed (Workers/ Freedom and Justice)
 45. Hassan al-Borns Hussein Baddar (Professionals / Freedom and Justice)
 46. Karem Abdul Hamid Sadiq (Workers/ Freedom and Justice)
 47. Ahmed Khalil Abdul Aziz al-Khairallah (Professionals/ al-Nour)
 48. Ahmed Abdel Hamid Abdel-Hamid al-Sayed (Farmers / al-Nour)
 49. Talaat Marzouk Abdel Aziz Saad (Professionals/ al-Nour)
 50. Abul Izz Hasan Ali al-Hariri (Professionals/ Revolution Continues)
 51. Ali Mohamed Ahmed (Farmers / Free Egyptians)
 52. Hassan Abdul Aziz Ahmed Ali (Workers/ al-Wafd)

Assuit (16 seats)

First District (Assuit)
 53. Ali Ezz al-Din Thabit Ali (Professionals/ Freedom and Justice)
 54. Mahmoud Helmi Ibrahim Faris (Workers/ Freedom and Justice)
 55. Mohamed Hamed Ahmed Osman (Professionals / Freedom and Justice)
 56. Mahmoud Mohamed Mustafa Abdullah (Professionals/ al-Nour)
 57. Ahmed Mohamed Ahmed Rifai (Workers/ Building and Development)
 58. Mohammad al-Farghali Sherif al-Farghali (Professionals/ Egyptian Social Democrat)
 59. Helmi Samwa’il ‘Azar Sharqawi (Workers/ Egyptian Social Democrat)
 60. Ahmed Mansour Mahmoud Selim (Workers / al-Wafd)

Second District (al-Fath)
 61. Mohamed Abdel-Aziz Sayed Khalifa (Professionals / Freedom and Justice)
 62. Mumtaz Ahmed Ali Nasser (Farmers / Freedom and Justice)
 63. Farghali Mohamed Farghali Ahmed (Professionals / Freedom and Justice)
 64. Mohamed Ahmed Hussein Mahran (Professionals/ al-Nour)
 65. Hamada Imam Ahmed Attia (Workers/ al-Nour)
 66. Ziad Ahmed Bahaa al-Din Abdel Aal (Professionals/ Egyptian Social Democrat)
 67. Sana Ahmed Mohamed Gamal al-Din (Workers/ Egyptian Social Democrat)
 68. Ahmed Metwally Mohamed Nasr (Workers/ Reform and Development)

Luxor (4 seats)
 69. Abdel-Hamid al-Sanusi Ahmed Abdullah (Professionals / Freedom and Justice)
 70. Bahi-Din Mohamed Abdel Dayem Mansour (Workers/ Freedom and Justice)
 71. Al-Hassan Bakri Nubi Ahmed (Professionals/ al-Nour)
 72. Nasreddin Mahmoud Maghazi (Workers/ al-Tagammu)

Fayoum (12 seats)

First District (Fayoum)
 73. Ahmed Mohamed Abdul Rahman Abdul Hadi (Professionals / Freedom and Justice)
 74. Ahmed Ibrahim Bayoumi Sabra (Workers/ Freedom and Justice)
 75. Sami Salama Noman (Professionals / Freedom and Justice)
 76. Nasr Mahmoud Abbas (Workers / Freedom and Justice)
 77. Hamada Mohamed Sulieman Awdah (Professionals / al-Nour)
 78. Mustafa Abdel-Latif Mahmoud (Farmers / al-Nour)
 79. Nasreddin Sheriff Abdel Ati (Workers/ Revolution Continues)
 80. Yasser Abdel Tawab Salloum (Farmers / Freedom)

Second District (Al-Sunwirs)
 81. Ahmedi Qasem Mohammad Saad (Workers / Freedom and Justice)
 82. Hatem Abdel Azim Abu Hasab Ali (Professionals / Freedom and Justice)
 83. Owais Yasin Ali Awad (Farmers / al-Nour)
 84. Wajih Abdel Kader Shaaban (Professionals/ al-Nour)

Port Said (4 seats)

First District (al-Sharq)
 85. Ali Mohamed Mustafa Dora (Professionals/ Freedom and Justice)
 86. Aladdin Mahmoud Mahmoud Baha’i (Professionals / al-Nour)
 87. Rashid Mohamed Awad Hutaibah (Workers/ al-Wasat)
 88. Mohamed Kamal al-Din Mohamed Gad (Workers/ al-Wafd)

Damietta (8 seats)

First District (Damietta 1)
 89. Saber Abdel Sadiq Mohamed Saeed (Professionals / Freedom and Justice)
 90. Tarek Hassan al- Desouki (Professionals / al-Nour)
 91. Salah al-Said al-Kholi (Workers / al-Nour)
 92. Nasser Mustafa Shakir (Professionals / al-Nour)
 93. Mohamed Abdel Hamid Mohamed Al-Hadidi (Workers/ Freedom and Justice)
 94. Mohamed Shawky Mohamed Ahmed al-Banna (Workers/ Freedom and Justice) 
 95. Essam Sultan (Professionals / al-Wasat)
 96. Hanan Saad Aboul Gheit Hassan (Workers/ al-Wafd)

Kafr Al-Sheikh (12 seats)

First District (Kafr al-Sheikh)
 97. Hassan Ali Abu She’sha Ali (Professionals / Freedom and Justice)
 98. Abdullah Ahmed Hamed Ahmed Hindawi (Workers/ Freedom and Justice)
 99. Nasri Saad Ibrahim Aldarnsa (Professionals / al-Karama)
 100. Al-Sayed Mustafa Hussein Khalifa (Professionals / al-Nour)
 101. Mohamed Faisal Mohamed Hossein Abedi (Workers/ al-Nour)
 102. Fawzi Ahmed Abdel Mohsen Hamid (Professionals / al-Nour)
 103. Mohamed Abdel Hakim Mohamed Hijazi (Workers/ al-Wafd)
 104. Mohamed Abdel Hamid Mohamed Hashem (Workers/ Reform and Development)

Second District (Desouk)
 105. Ragab Mohamed Mohamed Banna (Professionals / Freedom and Justice)
 106. Mustafa Mohamed Mustafa Daraz (Farmers / al-Nour)
 107. Yasser al-Baha Mohamed Barakat (Professionals / al-Wafd)
 108. Fathy Abdel Aziz Ibrahim Abdo (Workers/ Egypt National)

Red Sea (4 seats)

First District (Al-Qasir)
 109. Mohamed Awad Abdel-Aal Abdel Hamid (Professionals / Freedom and Justice)
 110. Zine al-Abidine Embarak Ali (Workers/ Freedom and Justice)
 111. Samih Fikri Makram Ebeid (Professionals / Free Egyptians Party)
 112. Shaaban Mohamed Ahmed Hussein (Workers/ Egyptian Citizen)

Beheira (20 seats)

First District (Damanhur)
 113. Mohamed Jamal Ahmed Hishmat (Professionals / Freedom and Justice)
 114. Mohamed Awad Abdul Ati Zayat (Workers/ Freedom and Justice)
 115. Mahdi Abdul Hamid Mohamed Qarsham (Workers/ Freedom and Justice)
 116. Mohamed Abdul Kafi Hamad Mansour (Farmers / Freedom and Justice)
 117. Zakaria Younis Abdel-Halim Mikhion (Professionals / al-Nour)
 118. Abd al-Aziz Abd Rabbo Abd al-Hamid (Farmers / al-Nour)
 119. Gamal Abdel Mohsen Ali Kreitim (Professionals / al-Nour)
 120. Ibrahim Ragheb Ibrahim Abdo (Workers/ al-Nour)
 121. Khalid Abdul Mawla Abdul Razek Khattab (Professionals / al-Nour)
 122. Wajih Abdel Fadil Issawi (Farmers / Free Egyptians Party)
 123. Yaqout Mohamed Yaqout al-Jamal (Professionals / al-Wafd)
 124. Adel Saad Gadallah Shaalan (Farmers / Egyptian Citizen)

Second District (Al-Dalnajat)
 125. Mohamed Ibrahim Abd al-Muttalib al-Hawari (Professionals / Freedom and Justice)
 126. Mohamed Shaaban Mohamed Issa (Farmers / Freedom and Justice)
 127. Mohamed Munib Ibrahim Geneidi (Professionals / al-Karama)
 128. Aladdin Saad Othman Amer (Professionals / al-Nour)
 129. Abdul Aziz Sobhi Abdul Aziz al-Amara (Farmers / al-Nour)
 130. Mohamed Hafiz Mohamed Numani (Professionals / al-Nour)
 131. Abdel-Fattah Mohamed Abdel Fattah Harash (Workers/ al-Wafd)
 132. Mohamed Shawqi Khalil Badr (Farmers / Union)

Giza (20 seats)

First District (Giza)
 133. Essam al-Din Mohamed al-Erian (Professionals / Freedom and Justice)
 134. Azab Mostafa Morsi Yaqout (Workers/ Freedom and Justice)
 135. Juma Mohamed Badri Mari (Professionals / Freedom and Justice)
 136. Ahmed Abd al-Sayed (Workers/ Freedom and Justice)
 137. Mohamed Abdel-Wahab Hassan Kurdi (Professionals / al-Nour)
 138. Abdel Bari Abu Ela Abdul Bari (Farmers / al-Nour)
 139. Ahmed Mohamed Ahmed Hamouda (Professionals / al-Nour)
 140. Salem Mohamed Abdel Majid Abu Shanab (Farmers / Free Egyptians)
 141. AbdulWahab Hassan Khalil (Professionals / al-Wafd)
 142. Muhyi al-Din Abdou Libna (Workers/ al-Wasat)

Second District (Al-Bulaq)
 143. Hilmi Al-Sayed Abd al-Aziz al-Jazzar (Professionals / Freedom and Justice)
 144. Khalid Mahmood Hamid Azhari (Workers/ Freedom and Justice)
 145. Kamal Mohamed Rifai Abu Eita (Professionals / al-Karama)
 146. Izzat Mohamed Ibrahim al-al-Jirf (Farmers / Freedom and Justice)
 147. Adel Yusuf Hassan Azzazi (Professionals / al-Nour)
 148. Nizar Mahmoud Abdul-Hamid Ghorab (Professionals / al-Nour)
 149. Farid Ali Hussein Ali (Farmers / al-Nour)
 150. Ayman Ahmed Hussein Abu al-Ela (Professionals / Egyptian Social Democrat)
 151. Abd al-Rahman Kamal Abbas (Workers/ al-Wafd)
 152. Mohamed Adly Issa (Workers/ al-Wasat)

Ismailia (4 seats)
 153. Hamdi Mohamed Mohamed Ismail (Professionals / Freedom and Justice)
 154. Aladdin Khalifa Omar Khalifa (Workers/ Freedom and Justice)
 155. Jamal Ali Ahmed Hassan (Professionals / al-Nour)
 156. Magda Hassan Al-Nouashi (Workers/ al-Wafd)

Al-Sharqiya (20 seats)

First District (Zagazig) 
 157. Ahmed Al-Sayed Ahmed Shehata (Professionals / Freedom and Justice)
 158. Mo’min Mohamed Ahmed Zaarour (Workers/ Freedom and Justice)
 159. Rida Abdullah Mohamed Atwa (Professionals / Freedom and Justice)
 160. Adel Radwan Othman Mohamed (Workers/ Freedom and Justice)
 161. Mohamed Hussein Mohamed Sharaf (Professionals / al-Nour)
 162. Jamal Mohamed Ibrahim Metwally (Farmers / al-Nour)
 163. Walid Jooda Afifi (Professionals / al-Nour)
 164. Atef Mohamed Maghoori (Workers / Egyptian Social Democrat)
 165. Mohamed Hani Abdul Ghaffar Abaza (Professionals / al-Wafd)
 166. Badr Bara’a Zakher Noman (Workers/ al-Wasat)

Second District (Abu Kabir) 
 167. Farid Ismail Abdel Halim Khalil (Professionals / Freedom and Justice)
 168. Ahmed Ali Ibrahim Ezz (Farmers / Freedom and Justice)
 169. Abbas Mohamed Mohamed Mukhaimar (Professionals / Freedom and Justice)
 170. Mahmoud Al-Sayed al-Wahid Abdel-Hamid (Workers/ Freedom and Justice)
 171. Ibrahim Abdel Aal Ibrahim Sayed (Professionals / al-Nour)
 172. Hisham Abdel-Aal Ibrahim Salem (Farmers / al-Nour)
 173. Talat Imad Eddin Sadiq Ahmed al-Sewedy (Professionals / al-Wafd)
 174. Mustafa Imam Mohamed Eidarous al-Hout (Farmers / al-Wafd)
 175. Majdi Sabri Abdul Rahim Elewa (Professionals / Free Egyptians)
 176. Saif Mohamed Rashad Salama (Farmers / Arab Egyptian Union)

Suez (4 seats) 
 177. Ahmed Mahmoud Mohamed Ibrahim (Professionals / Freedom and Justice)
 178. Abd al-Khaliq Mohamed Abdul Khaliq Ibrahim (Professionals / al-Asala)
 179. Abbas Mohamed Abbas Jooda (Workers/ al-Nour)
 180. Hakim Suleiman Mohamed Hussein (Workers/ Free Egyptians)

Menoufia (16 seats)

First District (Shebin) 
 181. Sabri Mohamed Amer Khader (Professionals / Freedom and Justice)
 182. Badr Abdel Aziz Mahmoud Al Falah (Farmers / Freedom and Justice)
 183. Mohamed Saeed Ibrahim Idris (Professionals / al-Karama)
 184. Salah Abd al-Maboud Fayed al-Sayed (Professionals / al-Nour)
 185. Atef Sayed Ahmed Yassin Qansa (Farmers / al-Nour)
 186. Isam Mohamed Abdel-Hamid Sabbahi (Farmers / al-Wafd)
 187. Ahmed Al-Sayed Sayed AbdelAal (Workers / Egypt National)
 188. Ahmed Refaat Mohamed Said (Farmers / Reform and Development)

Second District (Ashmoon)  
 189. Ashraf Mahmoud Mohamed Badr al-Din (Professionals / Freedom and Justice)
 190. Abdul-Fattah Mahmoud Eid (Workers/ Freedom and Justice)
 191. Atiya Adlan Atiya Ramadan (Professionals / Freedom and Justice)
 192. Mohamed Kamel Mustafa Kamel (Professionals / al-Wafd)
 193. Mahmoud Abu Saud Morsi Reesh (Farmers / al-Wafd)
 194. Jamal Mansour Mohamed Abdul Nabi (Professionals / al-Nour)
 195. Shafiq Mohamed Mohamed Shaheen (Farmers / Egypt National)
 196. Hilmi Ibrahim Al-Sayed Murad (Workers/ Reform and Development)

Beni Suef (12 seats)

First District (Beni Suef) 
 197. Hamdi Hussein Mohamed Zahran (Professionals / Freedom and Justice)
 198. Abdul Rahman Mohamed Shoukri Abdul Rahman (Farmers / Freedom and Justice)
 199. Mahmoud Saber Abdel Gawad Allam (Professionals / Freedom and Justice)
 200. Shaaban Ahmed Abdel-Alim (Professionals / al-Nour)
 201. Mohamed Mustafa Abdel-Hafiz (Farmers / al-Nour)
 202. Mohamed Mahrous Ahmed (Workers/ al-Nour)
 203. Omar Abdel-Jawad Abdel-Aziz (Professionals / al-Wafd)
 204. Khaled Hifni Abdullah Ali (Workers/ Revolution Continues)

Second District (Baba) 
 205. Saad Aboud Abdel Wahid Qutb (Professionals / al-Karama)
 206. Farouk Abdel Hafiz Abdel Atti Mabrouk (Workers/ Freedom and Justice)
 207. Mohamed Qurni Abdel Wahab, (Workers/ Egyptian Social Democrat)
 208. Abdel Tawab Mohamed Mohamed Uthman (Professionals / al-Nour)

Sohag (20 seats)

First District (Sohag) 
 209. Mohamed Saghir Abdul Rahim (Professionals / Building and Development)
 210. Ali Bahi al-Din al-Ansari (Workers / al-Nour)
 211. Abdul Nasser Hasan Mohamed (Workers / al-Nour)
 212. Rifaat Mohamed Sulieman (Farmers / al-Nour)
 213. Mohamed al-‘Atia Sagheer Hussein (Professionals / Freedom and Justice)
 214. Mohamed Yusuf Mahmoud Shatta (Workers / Freedom and Justice)
 215. Mukhtar Ahmed Mohamed Ahmed al-Sayed (Professionals / Freedom and Justice)
 216. Hussein Abdul Rahman Ibrahim Abu Duma (Farmers / Egyptian Social Democrat)
 217. Salah al-Din Mohamed Hussein al-‘Ajaji (Farmers / Egyptian Social Democrat)
 218. Ahmed Haridey Mahmoud Mohamed (Farmers / al-Wafd)
 219. Mohamed Hamid Ahmed al-Sabaq (Professionals / al-Wasat)
 220. Ahmed Mohamed Nasha’at Mansour (Professionals / Egypt National)

Second District (Garga) 
 221. Mohamed Mostafa Abdul Majid al-Ansari (Workers / Freedom and Justice)
 222. Ali al-Shadhili Badawi al-Sayed (Workers / Freedom and Justice)
 223. Mahmoud Hamdi Ahmed (Professionals / al-Nour)
 224. Ashraf Ahmed ‘Ajour Hasan (Farmers / al-Nour)
 225. Mohamed Abdul Rahman Hilali (Professionals / Free Egyptians )
 226. Ahmed Ahmed Ismail Abu Kreishi (Professionals / al-Wafd)
 227. Rafat Sayfeen Haleem Khalil (Farmers / Reform and Development)
 228. Abdul Fattah Ali Qasim Hasan (Farmers / Egyptian Citizen)

Aswan (4 seats) 
 229. Shahat Abdullah Omar Ahmed (Farmers / Freedom and Justice)
 230. Mohamed Mahmoud Hasanain Saleh (Farmers / al-Nour)
 231. Mohamed al-Mirghani Abdullah Dawud (Professionals / al-Wafd)
 232. Hilal Ahmed al-Dandrawi Mohamed (Workers / al-Tagammu)

Daqahliya (24 seats)

First District (Al-Mansoura) 
 233. Tareq al-Desouki Abdul Khalil Ali (Professionals / Freedom and Justice)
 234. Seham Abdul Lateef Mohamed al-Yamani al-Jamal (Farmers / Freedom and Justice)
 235. Ibrahim Faraj al-Qasabi Faraj (Farmers / Freedom and Justice)
 236. Ibrahim Mohamed Ahmed Abdul Rahman (Professionals / al-Nour)
 237. Hussein Abdul Jawad Abdul Mu’ti (Farmers / al-Nour)
 238. Mohamed Fo’ad Mushin Abdul Aziz Badrawi (Professionals / al-Wafd)
 239. Mohamed Shabani Mohamed Talba (Professionals / Revolution Continues)
 240. Hatem Hosni Mohamed Abdul Ghani (Workers / Democratic Peace)

Second District (Dakrnis) 
 241. Mohamed Mohamed Abdul Ghani Faraj (Professionals / Freedom and Justice)
 242. Al-Sadat Abdul Rahim Abdul Salam (Workers / Freedom and Justice)
 243. Adel Abbas Mohamed al-Qala (Professionals / Freedom and Justice)
 244. Rizq Mohamed Mohamed Ali Ahmed (Farmers / al-Nour)
 245. Mohamed Mohamed Hasan Issa (Professionals / al-Nour)
 246. Mohamed Hamdi Abul Gheit Mustajir al-Jamal (Workers / Revolution Continues)
 247. Ibrahim Mohamed Mohamed ‘Amasha (Professionals / al-Wafd)
 248.  Majdi Mohamed ‘Ala Kharibi (Workers / Revolution Continues)

Third District (Meet Ghamar) 
 249.  Mohamed Abdul ‘Aal Abbas Haykal (Professionals / Freedom and Justice)
 250.  Shafiq Mohamed Abdul Hayy Ibrahim al-Deeb (Workers / Freedom and Justice)
 251.  Mohamed Rajab Ismail ‘Awf (Professionals / Freedom and Justice)
 252.  Mostafa al-Sa’id al-Sawi Mutawa’i (Professionals / al-Nour)
 253.  Shareef Taha Hussein ‘Abdul Fadeel (Farmers / al-Nour)
 254.  Mostafa Abdul Aziz Ahmed al-Jindi (Professionals / Revolution Continues)
 255.  Badwi Abdul Latif Hilal Badwi (Farmers / al-Wafd)
 256. Al-Sayed Shahata Mohamed Khalifah (Democratic Peace)

Al-Gharbiya (20 Seats)

First District (Tanta) 
 257. Sayid Ahmed Yusuf Al-Sayed al-Shuri (Workers/ Freedom and Justice)
 258. Mohamed Mundah Mohamed al-Azbawi (Professionals / Freedom and Justice)
 259. Hamdi Abd al-Wahhab Ahmed Ramadan (Workers/ Freedom and Justice)
 260. Hani Adl Ahmed Saqr (Professionals / al-Nour)
 261. Mufrah Mohamed al-Shadhili (Professionals / al-Nour)
 262. Al-Sayed Mohamedi Al-Ajwani (Professionals / al-Nour)
 263. Mustafa Abdel-Raouf Newehy (Professionals / al-Wafd)
 264. Hussein Mahmoud Khalil (Farmers / al-Wafd)
 265. Hamada Ahmed Ibrahim Iqst (Professionals / Free Egyptians Party)
 266. Ashraf Talaat Mohamed al-Shabrawy (Farmers / Reform and Development)

Second District (Al-Mahalla) 
 267. Saad Esmat Mohamed al-Husseini (Professionals / Freedom and Justice)
 268. Mohamed Mustafa Adli Abdul Wahid (Workers / Freedom and Justice)
 269. Alaa al-Din Mohamed Ahmed Azab al-Qut (Professionals  / Freedom and Justice)
 270. Najah Saad Al-Mahrous Thabit (Workers / Freedom and Justice)
 271. Abdel Wahab Mohamed Zaki Faraj Al-Badri (Professionals  / al-Nour)
 272. Ahmed Ahmed Abdel al-Mu’ti Bialy (Farmers / al-Nour)
 273. Ahmed Zaki Ahmed Qattan (Professionals  / al-Nour)
 274. Ahmed Mahmoud Ahmed Atallah (Professionals  / al-Wafd)
 275. Nabil Tawfiq Al-Sayed Matlu’ (Farmers / al-Wafd)
 276. Atef Abdel Hay Abdel-Rahman Shakhba (Farmers / Free Egyptians)

Qaliubiya (12 Seats)

First District (Banha) 
 277. Mohamed Emad al-Din Abdel-Hamid Sabir (Professionals / Freedom and Justice)
 278. Mohamed Abdel Majid Ibrahim Desouki (Farmers / Freedom and Justice)
 279. Nader Abdul-Khaliq Abd al-Hamid Afifi (Professionals / al-Nour)
 280. Al-Sayed Fouad Ahmed Kush (Workers / al-Wafd)

Second District (Shubra) 
 281. Mohamed Mohamed Ibrahim Beltagy (Professionals / Freedom and Justice)
 282. Abdullah Ahmed Mohamed Khalil (Workers / Freedom and Justice)
 283. Huda Mohamed Anwar al-Abdul Rahman Al-Ghaniyeh (Professionals / Freedom and Justice)
 284. Hassan Al-Sayed Mohamed Abu al-Azm Sayed (Professionals / al-Nour)
 285. Mohamed Hassan Abdel-Salam Hassan (Workers / al-Nour)
 286. Najib Lutfi Najib Farid (Workers / Reform and Development)
 287. Mohamed Abdul Alim Abdul Aziz Salim (Workers / al-Wafd)
 288. Fathi Desouki Syed Ali (Workers / Egyptian Social Democrat)

Minya (16 Seats)

First District (Minya) 
 289. Mohamed Saad Tawfik Al Katatni (Professionals / Freedom and Justice)
 290. Mohamed Abdel Azim Mohamed Ahmed (Workers / Freedom and Justice)
 291. Mohamed Hassan Aref Metwally (Professionals / Freedom and Justice)
 292. Mustafa Abdul-Khaliq Mehdi Sayed (Workers / Freedom and Justice)
 293. Amr Magdi Makram Abdel Latif (Professionals / Building and Development)
 294. Saleh Abdel-Azim Abdel-Fattah (Workers / al-Nour)
 295. Ihab Adel Ramzi Hanna (Professionals / Freedom Party)
 296. Mustafa Morsi Osman Seif al-Nasr (Farmers / al-Wasat)

Second District (Wasat Minya) 
 297. Hussein Sultan Mohamed Nassar (Professionals / Freedom and Justice)
 298. Bahaa Eddin Sayed Attia Suleiman (Workers / Freedom and Justice)
 299. Mohamed Abu Bakr Mohamed Hassan (Professionals / Freedom and Justice)
 300. Mohamed Khalifa Hussein Omar (Professionals / Egyptian Social Democrat)
 301. Ashraf Sayed Mohamed Shawky (Farmers / Egyptian Social Democrat)
 302. Mohamed Ahmed Mohamedein al-Munshid (Farmers / al-Nour)
 303. Mohamed Talaat Mohamed Osman (Professionals / al-Nour)
 304. Mohamed Abdel-Hafiz Mohamed Abdul Hafeez (Farmers / al-Wafd)

Marsa Matruh (4 seats) 
 305. Faraj Ali Abdullah al-Hamid Abd al-Mawla (Professionals / al-Nour)
 306. Khayr Allah Abdul Aziz Hussein Marda (Farmers / al-Nour)
 307. Sa’ad Jab Allah Abu Yusuf Masud (Professionals / al-Nour)
 308. Bilal Jibril Abdullah (Workers / Freedom and Justice)

Qena (12 Seats)

First District (Qena) 
 309. Mahmoud Yusuf Mahmoud Abdul-Rahim (Professionals / Freedom and Justice)
 310. Mu’taz Mohamed Mahmoud Ali Hussein (Professionals / Freedom Party)
 311. Hassan Bakri Ahmed Bakri (Farmers / al-Nour)
 312. Jamal Mohamed Ahmed Ammar Awad (Farmers / al-Wafd)

Second District (Naja’ Hamadi) 
 313. Abdul Nasser Tughyan Abd al-Aal Mahmoud (Professionals / Freedom and Justice)
 314. Yunus Sabir Hussein Ali (Workers / Freedom and Justice)
 315. Abd al-Karim Mohamed Ahmed Ibrahim (Professionals / al-Nour)
 316. Mohamed Jab Allah Abdulaziz Mohamed (Farmers / al-Nour)
 317. Hussein Fayiz Abdul ‘Ala al-Shadhili (Professionals / Union)
 318. Abdul Nabi Mohamed Abdul Nabi Salman (Professionals / Union)
 319. Ahmed Mukhtar Othman Mohamed (Workers / al-Wafd)
 320. Ahmed Mohamed Hussein Mohamed (Farmers / Egyptian Social Democrat)

New Valley (4 Seats) 
 321. Sameh Sa’dawi Mohamed Ali (Professionals / Freedom and Justice)
 322. Salah Mohamed Hafez Mohamed Adam (Professionals / al-Nour)
 323. Kamal Mohamed Mahmoud Abdul Jawad (Workers / al-Nour)
 324. Bardis Seif al-Din ‘Amran Mubarak (Workers / Nasserite Party)

North Sinai (4 Seats) 
 325. Sulieman Salim Saleh Salem (Professionals / Freedom and Justice)
 326. Khaled Mohamed Muslim Ali Salma (Workers / Freedom and Justice)
 327. Muhsin Abdul Aziz Hussein (Professionals / al-Nour)
 328. Salama Salim Salman Salim (Workers / Reform and Development)

South Sinai (4 Seats) 
 329. Abdullah Ibrahim al-Desouki Abd Rabbu (Professionals / Freedom and Justice)
 330. Ahmed Ibrahim Qassim Metwali (Workers / Freedom and Justice)
 331. Fadiya Salim Obeidallah Salim (Professionals / Reform and Development)
 332. Ahmed Ramadan Abdul Ghaffar Wahdan (Workers / al-Wafd)

Individual Member District Seats (166)

Cairo (18 seats) 
 1. Fahmy Abdou Mustafa (Professionals / Freedom and Justice)
 2. Kamal Hassan Mahdi (Workers / Freedom and Justice)
 3. Amr Mohamed Zaky (Professionals / Freedom and Justice)
 4. Yasser Ibrahim Abdullah (Workers / Freedom and Justice)
 5. Mustafa Ahmed Al-Naggar (Professionals / al-Adl)
 6. Amr Farouk Awda (Workers / Independent)
 7. Amr Nabil Ahmed Hamzawy (Professionals / Independent)
 8. Hisham Suleiman Musa (Workers / Independent)
 9. Sayed Hussein Mohamed Gadalla (Professionals / Freedom and Justice)
 10. Ashraf Saad Abdul-Latif (Workers / Freedom and Justice)
 11. Mohamed Abu Hamed Shedid (Professionals / Free Egyptians Party)
 12. Mustafa Farghali Rashwan (Workers / Freedom and Justice)
 13. Khalid Mohamed Ahmed Mohamed (Professionals / Freedom and Justice)
 14. Nasser Eddin Ibrahim Osman (Workers / Freedom and Justice)
 15. Khaled Hanafi Faheem Hussain (Professionals / Freedom and Justice)
 16. Yousry Mohamed Bayoumi (Workers / Freedom and Justice)
 17. Mohamed Mustafa Bakri Mohamed (Professionals / Independent)
 18. Ramadan Ahmed Omar Salem (Workers / Freedom and Justice)

Alexandria (8 seats) 
 19. Hosni Mohamed Taha Dowidar (Professionals / Independent)
 20. Mustafa Mohamed Mustafa (Workers / Freedom and Justice)
 21. Mahmoud Reda Abdel Aziz al-Khudairi (Professionals / Independent)
 22. Al-Mohamedi al-Sayed Ahmed Abu al-Hamd (Workers / Freedom and Justice)
 23. Mahmoud Atiyya Mabrouk (Professionals / Freedom and Justice)
 24. Saber Abu al-Fotouh Badawi al-Sayed (Workers / Freedom and Justice)
 25. Essam Mohamed Hassanein (Professionals / al-Nour)
 26. Essam Mahmoud Rajab (Workers / Independent)

Kafr Al-Sheikh (6 seats) 
 27. Mohamed Ibrahim Abdel-Hamid Mansour (Professionals / al-Nour)
 28. Mohamed Abdel-Majid Abu She’sha (Farmers / al-Nour)
 29. Mohamed Ibrahim Darwish Amer (Professionals / Freedom and Justice)
 30. Ashraf Mohamed Al-Saeed Yusuf (Workers / Freedom and Justice)
 31. Yusuf Al-Badri Abdel-Fattah (Professionals / Egypt National)
 32. Mohamed Abdel-Alim Dawoud (Workers / al-Wafd)

Damietta (4 seats) 
 33. Ali Hasan Hasan Al-Day (Professionals / Freedom and Justice)
 34. Mohamed Al-Sayed Ahmed Abu Musa (Workers / Freedom and Justice)
 35. Mohamed Mohamed Al-Filahjy (Professionals / Freedom and Justice)
 36. Imran Mohamed Mujahid (Workers / Independent)

Port Said (2 seats) 
 37. Akram Al-Mendoh Awad Al-Shaer (Professionals / Freedom and Justice)
 38. Al-Badri Farghali Ali (Workers / Independent)

Al-Fayoum (6 seats) 
 39. Adel Ismail Abdel-Hamid Musa (Professionals / Freedom and Justice)
 40. Hamdi Taha Abdul Rahim Al-Issa (Farmers / Freedom and Justice)
 41. Osama Yahya Abd Al-Wahid Yahya (Professionals / Freedom and Justice)
 42. Sayed Abdel-Karim Jabr Nasr (Farmers / Freedom and Justice)
 43. Jamal Hassan Abdel Latif (Professionals / Freedom and Justice)
 44. Fawzi Ali Abdul Aziz (Farmers / Freedom and Justice)

Assiut (8 seats) 
 45. Samir Othman Ibrahim Khashaba (Professionals / Freedom and Justice)
 46. Bayoumi Ismail Abdel-Jaber (Workers / Building and Development)
 47. Mohamed Salama Bakr (Professionals / Freedom and Justice)
 48. Mohamed Modir Moussa (Workers / Freedom and Justice)
 49. Abdul Aziz Khalaf Mohamed Ali (Professionals / Freedom and Justice)
 50. Abdullah Sadek Noshi Ahmed (Workers / Freedom and Justice)
 51. Hassan Ali Abd Al-Al Amer (Professionals / Freedom and Justice)
 52. Amer Abdel Rahim Mahmoud Ali (Farmers / Building and Development)

Luxor (2 seats) 
 53. Abdul Mawjod Rajeh Dardiri (Professionals / Freedom and Justice)
 54. Khaled Abdel Moneim Farag (Farmers / Freedom Party)

Red Sea (2 seats) 
 55. Mohamed Mahmoud Yusuf Katamesh (Professionals / Freedom and Justice)
 56. Abdel Al-Baset Sayyid Mubarak (Workers / Egyptian Citizen)

Beheira (10 seats) 
 57. Osama Mohamed Ibrahim Soliman (Professionals / Freedom and Justice)
 58. Tareq Rajab Saleh Mohamed Saleh (Workers / Freedom and Justice)
 59. Mahmoud Abdullah Ibrahim Mabrouk Haiba (Professionals / al-Nour)
 60. Yasser Ali Abdul Rafi Ali (Farmers / Freedom and Justice)
 61. Ahmed Zuhair Mohamed Said (Professionals / Freedom and Justice)
 62. Masry Saad Masry Mohareb (Farmers / Freedom and Justice)
 63. Abdullah Mohamed Mohamed Saad (Professionals / al-Nour)
 64. Hamid Abdellah Khalil Al-Tuhan (Farmers / Al-Nour)
 65. Saad Mahmoud Mohamed Abu Talib (Professionals / Freedom and Justice)
 66. Ahmed Al-Sayed Yusuf Khater (Workers / Independent)

Al-Sharqiya (10 seats) 
 67. Al-Sayed Abdul Aziz Ismail Negeida (Professionals / Freedom and Justice)
 68. Saleh Ali Ahmed Suleiman (Workers / Freedom and Justice)
 69. Amir Mohamed Bassam Al-Najjar (Professionals / Freedom and Justice)
 70. Mohamed Mohamed Abdul Rauf Ismail (Workers / Freedom and Justice)
 71. Mohamed Fayyad Abdel Moneim Fayyad (Professionals / Freedom and Justice)
 72. Ibrahim Mohamed Mohamed Salim (Farmers / Freedom and Justice)
 73. Mohamed Safwat Al-Hadi Sweilem (Professionals / Freedom and Justice)
 74. Mohamed Awad Mohamed Shawish (Workers / Freedom and Justice)
 75. Ahmed Suleiman Ahmed Ibrahim (Professionals / Freedom and Justice)
 76. Al-Sayed Mohamed Abdul Karim Al-Atawil (Workers / Freedom and Justice)

Al-Menoufia (8 seats) 
 77. Helmy Al-Sayed Mohamed Bakr (Professionals / Independent)
 78. Saad Mohamed Yousuf Hussein (Workers / Freedom and Justice)
 79. Mohamed Anwar Esmat Sadat (Farmers / Reform and Development)
 80. Said Al-Azb Abdul Qader Eid (Workers / Freedom and Justice)
 81. Nasr Ali Ahmed Tahoun (Professionals / Independent)
 82. Mahmoud Ali Mohamed Abul Magd (Workers / Freedom and Justice)
 83. Ibrahim Ibrahim Mustafa Hajjaj (Professionals / Freedom and Justice)
 84. Anwar Saeed Anwar Al-Bulkimy (Workers / al-Nour)

Giza (10 seats) 
 85. Mohamed Ibrahim Ahmed Hussein (Professionals / Freedom and Justice)
 86. Khattab Sayed Khattab Murad (Workers / Freedom and Justice)
 87. Gamal Abdel Fattah Ali Ashri (Professionals / Freedom and Justice)
 88. Hassan Boraik Khalifa Boraik (Workers / Freedom and Justice)
 89. Mohamed Amr Mahmoud Al-Shobki (Professionals / Independent affiliated with al-Adl)
 90. Ayman Mahmoud Sadek Refaat (Workers / Freedom and Justice)
 91. Mohamed Abdel-Moneim Mahmoud Al-Sawy (Professionals / al-Hadara)
 92. Abdul Salam Zaki Mohamed Bashandi (Workers / Freedom and Justice)
 93. Mahmoud Mohamed Ali Amer (Professionals / Freedom and Justice)
 94. Mustafa Mohamed Ibrahim Salman (Farmers / Independent)

Beni Suef (6 seats) 
 95. Jaber Mansour Abdel Wahab Yassin (Professionals / Freedom and Justice)
 96. Najm al-Din Aziz Fadel Salim (Workers / al-Nour)
 97. Mohamed Shakir Abdul Baqi Miahub (Professionals / Freedom and Justice)
 98. Abdul Hakim Mohamed Mohamed Masoud (Farmers / al-Nour)
 99. Nihad al-Qasim Sayed Abdul Wahab Khudair (Professionals / Freedom and Justice)
 100. Abd al-Qader Abdul-Wahab Abdul Qader Ismail (Workers / Freedom and Justice)

Sohag (10 seats) 
 101. Walid Abdul Awal Mahmoud Ibrahim (Professionals / al-Nour)
 102. Mustafa Abdul-Hamid Ali Abd al-Rahim (Farmers / Freedom and Justice)
 103. Mohamed Mohamed Abdul Rahman Al Sayed (Professionals / Freedom and Justice)
 104. Adlan Mahmoud Ahmed Morsi (Farmers / Building and Development)
 105. Mohamed Masaad Imam Al-Harzjy (Professionals / Freedom and Justice)
 106. Lahdha Ahmed Najdi Hasan (Farmers / Building and Development)
 107. Jabir Abdul Moneim Ali Mohamed (Professionals / Building and Development)
 108. Faisal Mohamed Ali Hassan (Farmers / Independent)
 109. Rafat Mohamed Mahmoud Ahmed (Professionals / Independent)
 110. Yusuf Hassan Yusuf Ahmed (Farmers / Independent)

Ismailia (2 seats) 
 111. Mohamed Hisham Mustafa Al-Suli (Professionals / Freedom and Justice)
 112. Mohamed Abdullah Ali Hawari (Farmers / al-Nour)

Suez (2 seats) 
 113. Abbas Abdel Aziz Abbas Mohamed (Professionals / Freedom and Justice)
 114. Hani Nur al-Din Abu Bakr (Workers / Building and Development)

Aswan (2 seats) 
 115. Mohamed Mahmoud Ali Hamid (Professionals / Independent)
 116. Faraj Allah Gadalla Ahmed Mohamed (Workers / Building and Development)

Al-Gharbiya (10 seats) 
 117. Mohamed Abdel-Hamid Ahmed Feki (Professionals / al-Wafd)
 118. Sayed Abdel-Maksoud ‘Askar (Workers / Freedom and Justice)
 119. Ali Abdel Fattah Ali Najm (Professionals / al-Nour)
 120. Mahmoud Ismail Muhduyeh (Farmers / Freedom and Justice)
 121. Hamdi al-Dessouki Mohamed al-Fakhrani (Professionals / Independent)
 122. Mahmoud Tawfiq Mohamed Abdel Aal (Workers / Freedom and Justice)
 123. Sameh Abdel Hamid Shawki Ibrahim (Professionals / Freedom and Justice)
 124. Abdul-Aziz Yahya Abdul-Aziz (Workers / Freedom and Justice)
 125. Ibrahim Zakaria Ibrahim Younis (Professionals / Freedom and Justice)
 126. Mohamed Maher Sayed Shehata (Farmers / Independent)

Daqahliya (12 seats) 
 127. Yusr Mohamed Han’i (Professionals / Freedom and Justice)
 128. Tariq Mohamed Qutb (Workers / Freedom and Justice)
 129. Ali Ibrahim Ali Qatamesh (Professionals / al-Nour)
 130. Saad Ali Abdu Halwaji (Workers / Freedom and Justice)
 131. Imad Shams al-Din Mohamed Abdel-Rahman (Professionals / Freedom and Justice)
 132. Abdul Hamid Mohamed Hassan Issa (Workers / Freedom and Justice)
 133. Ibrahim Ibrahim Abu Awf Yusuf (Professionals / Freedom and Justice)
 134. Khalid Mustafa Kamel (Workers / Independent)
 135. Khalid Mohamed Metwally al-Deeb (Professionals / Freedom and Justice)
 136. Tahir Ahmed Al-Saeed Atta (Farmers / Independent)
 137. Al-Sayed Mohamed Niazi al-‘Adawi (Professionals / Freedom and Justice)
 138. Osama Mohamed Abdel Ati Metwally (Farmers / Independent)

Qaliubiya (6 seats) 
 139. Mohsen Radi (Professionals / Freedom and Justice)
 140. Ali Wanis (Workers / al-Nour)
 141. Nasser al-Hafi (Professionals / Freedom and Justice)
 142. Jamal Shehata (Workers / Freedom and Justice)
 143. Ahmed Mohamed Mahmoud Diab (Professionals / Freedom and Justice)
 144. Sayed Imam Mahmoud al-Qadi (Workers / Freedom and Justice)

Minya (8 seats) 
 145. Ali Ahmed Mohamed Omran (Professionals / Freedom and Justice)
 146. Gom’a Yusuf Ahmed Kafafi (Workers / Freedom and Justice)
 147. Mohamed Abdullah Hassan al-Basil (Professionals / Freedom and Justice)
 148. Hamdi Khalifah Mohamed Abdul Nabi (Workers / Freedom and Justice)
 149. Musharraf Ahmed Mohamed Musharraf (Professionals / al-Nour)
 150. Ahmed Hassan Sayed Abboud (Workers / al-Nour)
 151. Medhat Abdel Jaber Ali Yusuf (Professionals / al-Nour)
 152. Ahmed Yusuf Tony Abu al-Khair (Farmers / Building and Development)

Qena (6 seats) 
 153. Ahmed Sayed Mohamed al-Saghir (Professionals / Freedom and Justice)
 154. Adel Mohamed Obaid Ahmed (Farmers / Building and Development)
 155. Mohamed Yunus Mohamed Ali (Professionals / Independent)
 156. Hisham Ahmed Hanfi Abdullah (Farmers / Freedom and Justice)
 157. Ali Ibrahim Ahmed al-Shishani (Professionals / Freedom and Justice)
 158. Abdul Nasser Sayed Mohamed Abdel-Halim (Workers / Building and Development)

Marsa Matrouh (2 seats) 
 159. Mansour Deef (Professionals / al-Nour)
 160. Mansour al-‘Aqari Qawiya (Farmers / al-Nour)

New Valley (2 seats) 
 161. Mohamed Abdel Majid Hamid (Professionals / Freedom and Justice)
 162. Aladdin Abdul Latif Ismail (Workers / al-Nour)

North Sinai (2 seats) 
 163. Abd al-Rahman Said Abdel-Rahman Dawud (Professionals / Freedom and Justice)
 164. Ali Mohamed Salman (Workers / Independent)

South Sinai (2 seats) 
 165. Mohamed Farag Salem Moussa (Professionals / al-Nour)
 166. Gharib Ahmed Hassan Ali (Workers / Independent)

SCAF-Appointed Seats (10) 
 1. Susie Adly Nashed
 2. Marianne Malak Kamal
 3. Hanna Gerges Grayss
 4. George Nagy Messiah
 5. Tarek Makram Shaker
 6. Abdullah Mohammed al-Maghazi
 7. Yasser Salah Abdel Aziz Abdel Maguid
 8. Abdullah Salim Jahama
 9. Sherif Mohamed Abdel Hameed Zahran
 10. Omar Saber Abdel Galil

References

2011-2012 election results
Legislatures by legislative term of office
2012 in Egypt
Election results in Egypt